Truncadaphne is a genus of sea snails, marine gastropod mollusks in the family Raphitomidae.

Species
Species within the genus Truncadaphne include:
 Truncadaphne stonei (Hertlein & Strong, 1939)
Species brought into synonymy
 Truncadaphne permiscere (Nowell-Usticke, 1969): synonym of Hemilienardia chrysoleuca (J.C. Melvill, 1923)

References

External links
 McLean, J.H. (1971) A revised classification of the family Turridae, with the proposal of new subfamilies, genera, and subgenera from the Eastern Pacific. The Veliger, 14, 114–130
 

 
Monotypic gastropod genera
Raphitomidae